The Amber Room is American author Steve Berry's debut novel. The book is set around the mystery behind the Amber Room's disappearance at the end of World War II (a treasure stolen by Nazis in 1941 from the Catherine Palace in Tsarskoe Selo, Russia, it subsequently disappeared in 1945, amidst the chaos at the end of the war).

It was published in 2003, and has since been followed up by The Romanov Prophecy, in 2004.

Plot summary
The story is about judge Rachel Cutler and her husband Paul, a divorced American couple caught up in a treasure hunt for the long-missing Amber Room. A couple of competitive professional treasure hunters complicate matters. In their search through Germany to uncover the secrets behind its disappearance, they escape near-death in the tunnels running through the Harz Mountains, find themselves hanging off the edge of a tall church steeple, and discover a surprise in a hidden chamber of a Bohemian castle in the Czech Republic.

Release details
2003, USA, Ballantine, Westminster, 2003, hardback (First edition)

External links
Official Website of Steve Berry
History Matters, the Steve and Elizabeth Berry foundation to preserve historical sites.

2003 American novels
American thriller novels
American mystery novels
Novels set in Germany
Ballantine Books books
2003 debut novels